The Shevchenko mine is a large mine in the north-west of Kazakhstan. Shevchenko represents one of the largest nickel reserves in Kazakhstan having estimated reserves of 104.4 million tonnes of ore grading 0.75% nickel.  The 104.4 million tonnes of ore contains 0.78 million tonnes of nickel metal.

See also 
Mineral industry of Kazakhstan

References 

Nickel mines in Kazakhstan